Kieran Doherty (16 October 1955 – 2 August 1981) was an Irish republican hunger striker and politician who served as a Teachta Dála (TD) for the Cavan–Monaghan constituency from June 1981 to August 1981. He was a volunteer in the Belfast Brigade of the Provisional Irish Republican Army (IRA).

Background
Doherty was the third son in a family of six. He was born in Andersonstown area of Belfast. He was educated at St. Theresa's Primary School and Glen Road Christian Brothers School (CBS). The Doherty brothers were known cyclists and sportsmen in the Andersontown area; Kieran won an Antrim Gaelic football medal at minor level in 1971.

Doherty joined Fianna Éireann in 1971 and was interned by the British Government between February 1973 and November 1975. Kieran's brothers Michael and Terence were interned between 1972 and 1974.

Doherty worked as an apprentice heating engineer. His girlfriend was Geraldine Scheiss; although they never became formally engaged they became very close towards the end of his life. Before his arrest, she had not known that he was in the IRA.

Paramilitary activity
In August 1976, while he was out to set a bomb, the van he was in was chased by the Royal Ulster Constabulary (RUC). During the chase Doherty managed to leave the van and hijack a car. He was convicted and sentenced to 18 years for possession of firearms and explosives, with another four years for the hijack.

Hunger strike
Doherty started his strike on 22 May. He died at the age of 25 in the 1981 Irish hunger strike in the Maze Prison (known to republicans as Long Kesh). He lasted 73 days on hunger strike, the longest of the 1981 hunger strikers, and only one day short of Terence MacSwiney.

Election to Dáil Éireann
While on hunger strike he was elected as an Anti H-Block TD for the Cavan–Monaghan constituency at the 1981 general election, which was held in Ireland on 11 June. He received 9,121 (15.1%) first preference votes and was elected on the fourth count. Doherty is the shortest-serving Dáil deputy ever, having served as a TD for two months. The two seats gained by Anti H-Block candidates denied Taoiseach Charles Haughey the chance to form a government, and the 22nd Dáil saw a Fine Gael-Labour Party coalition government come to office, with Garret FitzGerald as Taoiseach.

Legacy

He is commemorated on the Irish Martyrs Memorial at Waverley Cemetery in Sydney, Australia. In October 2016, a painting of him was unveiled in Leinster House by Sinn Féin.

See also
List of members of the Oireachtas imprisoned since 1923

References

1955 births
1981 deaths
Anti H-Block TDs
Irish republicans
Irish republicans interned without trial
Members of the 22nd Dáil
People who died on the 1981 Irish hunger strike
Politicians from Belfast
Provisional Irish Republican Army members